The Wildcat is a lost 1917 silent film comedy drama produced by Balboa Amusement Producing Company, distributed by the Mutual Film company and starring Jackie Saunders.

Cast
Jackie Saunders - Bethesda Carewe, The Wildcat
Daniel Gilfether - Roger Carewe
Mollie McConnell - Mathilda Carewe
Arthur Shirley - Mortimer Hunt
Nell Holman - Mollie
Bruce Smith -

References

External links
 
lobby poster advertisement

1917 films
American silent feature films
Lost American films
1910s English-language films
1917 comedy-drama films
American black-and-white films
Mutual Film films
1917 lost films
Lost comedy-drama films
1910s American films
Silent American comedy-drama films